Al Emmo and the Lost Dutchman's Mine is an adventure game created by Himalaya Studios for the PC.

Development
Al Emmo and the Lost Dutchman's Mine is designed to be a homage to the classic Sierra and LucasArts style point and click classic adventure games of the 1980s and 1990s.

This game is the first original and commercial game created by Himalaya Studios. The same team is also responsible for designing the King's Quest 1 and 2 remakes at AGD Interactive, and drew upon this experience to create Al Emmo. The game runs on the popular Adventure Game Studio engine, and shows off some of the engine's more versatile features such as, fully lip-synced dialogue portraits and its ability to handle complex animations.

It utilizes hand-painted backgrounds and pre-rendered 3D character animation frames.

In September 2012, an enhanced edition of the game featuring reworked 2D animated cut scenes and a new protagonist voice actor was announced. The enhanced edition was released in November 2013 on the Himalaya Studios website, and was made available on the Steam platform in May 2014.

Al Emmo and The Lost Dutchman's Mine was released on 5 September 2006.

Plot
The plot is loosely based on the popular Arizonan legend of the Lost Dutchman's Gold Mine.

The game's protagonist, Al Emmo, is stranded in the barren desert land of Anozira after being stood up by a mail-order bride whom he had hoped would impress his parents. Following this, Al misses his train back to New York and is stuck in the wild west for a whole week without money, housing, or any knowledge on what to do next.

Later, Al develops feelings for another woman, Rita Peralto, a beautiful singer at the local saloon. Al believes he has a chance with her until Antonio Bandanna, a dashing Spaniard, arrives and begins upstaging him at every turn. Al soon hears a legend of a lost gold mine in the nearby desert. Al sets out to find it, believing that if he can cure Rita's financial troubles, he can win her affection. It's only upon arrival that he discovers the mine's haunted nature.

Public Reception 

The game received mixed reviews on Steam when it was released, with 60% of reviewers giving positive ratings.

References

External links
 Official website
 

2006 video games
Adventure games
Adventure Game Studio games
Linux games
Point-and-click adventure games
Video games developed in the United States
Windows games